Ko Woo-soon (born 21 April 1964), also known as Woo-Soon Ko, is a South Korean professional golfer.

Ko won twice on the LPGA Tour in 1994 and 1995, both as a non-member.

Professional wins (11)

LPGA of Korea Tour wins (3)
1988 (1) Korea Women's Open
1989 (1) Korea Women's Open
1991 (1) Korea Women's Open

LPGA of Japan Tour wins (8)
1994 (2) Kibun Ladies Classic, Toray Japan Queens Cup (co-sanctioned with LPGA Tour)
1995 (1) Toray Japan Queens Cup (co-sanctioned with LPGA Tour)
1997 (2) Daikin Orchid Ladies Tournament, Nasu-Ogawa Ladies Pro-Golf Tournament
2000 (1) Hisako Higuchi Kibun Classic
2002 (2) Japan Women's Open, Japan LPGA Tour Championship

Tournament in bold denotes major championships in LPGA of Japan Tour.

LPGA Tour wins (2)

LPGA Tour playoff record (1–0)

References

External links

Sponsor profile

South Korean female golfers
LPGA of Japan Tour golfers
1964 births
Living people